Goodin is a surname. Notable people with the surname include:

Brett Goodin (born 1985), New Zealand rugby player
John R. Goodin (1836–1885), American politician
Peggy Goodin (1923–1983), American novelist 
Stephen Goodin (born 1988), American football player
Terry Goodin (born 1966), American politician
Vern Goodin (1892–1971), American politician